Simona Bortolotti (born 6 December 1994) is an Italian professional racing cyclist, who currently rides for UCI Women's Team .

See also
 List of 2015 UCI Women's Teams and riders

References

External links
 

1994 births
Living people
Italian female cyclists
Place of birth missing (living people)
Sportspeople from Trentino
Cyclists from Trentino-Alto Adige/Südtirol